The Roman Catholic Archdiocese of Olomouc is a metropolitan archdiocese of the Latin Church of the Catholic Church in the Czech Republic. It has its seat in Olomouc.

Special churches
Its cathedral is Cathedral of St. Wenceslaus in Olomouc and it has three Marian minor basilicas:
 Basilica of the Assumption of the Virgin Mary in Hostýn, Zlín Region
 Basilica of the Assumption of the Virgin Mary and Saints Cyril and Methodius in Velehrad, Zlín Region
 Basilica of the Visitation of the Virgin Mary in Olomouc, Olomouc Region

Statistics
As of 2015, it pastorally served 746,900 Catholics (53.0% of 1,410,000 total) on 10,018 km² in 418 parishes and 2 missions with 343 priests (246 diocesan, 97 religious), 33 deacons, 326 lay religious (117 brothers, 209 sisters) and 19 seminarians.

Ecclesiastical province
Its suffragan sees are :
 Roman Catholic Diocese of Brno 
 Roman Catholic Diocese of Ostrava-Opava

History
Established in 1063 as Diocese of Olomouc / Olomucen(sis) (Latin), on territory split off from the then Diocese of Prague (now Metropolitan) and promoted on 5 December 1777 to Metropolitan Archdiocese of Olomouc / Olomucen(sis) (Latin) (lost territory to establish Diocese of Brno).
In 1788 it gained territory from the Diocese of Wrocław (Breslau, Silesia), in 1863 exchanged territory with Moravian Diocese of Brno.
 15 March 1945: Lost territory to establish Apostolic Administration of Opole
 31 May 1978: Gained territory from the suppressed Apostolic Administration of Český Těšín
 It was visited Pope John Paul II in April 1990 and May 1995.
 30 May 1996: Lost territory to establish Diocese of Ostrava-Opava as its suffragan

Episcopal ordinaries

Suffragan Bishops of Olomouc
 Jan (John) (1063–1085)
 Vezel (1088–1091)
 Ondřej (1091–1096)
 Jindřich (1096–1099)
 Petr (1099–1104)
 Jan (1104–1126)
 Jindřich Zdík, Norbertines (O. Praem.) (1126–1151)
 Jan (1151–1157)
 Jan of Litomyšl (1157–1172)
 Dětleb (1172–1182)
 Pelhřim (1182–1184)
 Kaim of Bohemia (1184–1194)
 Engelbert von Brabant (1194–1199)
 Jan Bavor (1199–1201)
 Robert (1201–1240)
 Father Wilhelm (1241–1245 not possessed)
 Konrad von Friedberg (1241–1245)
 ...
 Auxiliary Bishop: Vilem Kolina, O.E.S.A. (16 May 1442 – 1482?)
 ...
 Auxiliary Bishop: André Byssmann, O.E.S.A. (21 June 1482 – 1501)
 
 ...
 Cardinal Franz (Seraph) von Dietrichstein (1599.09.01 – 1636.11.23)
 Auxiliary Bishop: Giovanni Battista Civalli, O.F.M. Conv. (1608.01.28 – 1617.01.29)
 Auxiliary Bishop: Philipp Friedrich Reichsfreiherr von Breuner (1630.09.09 – 1639.09.05)
 Fr. Archduke Leopold Wilhelm of Austria (1637.11.16 – 1662.11.02)
 Auxiliary Bishop: Sigismund Graf Miutini von Spilenberg (1648.03.30 – 1653)
 Auxiliary Bishop: Johann Gobar (1652.08.26 – 1665)
 Fr. Karl Joseph Erzherzog von Österreich (1663.04.23 – 1664.01.27)
 Karl Graf von Liechtenstein-Kastelkorn (1664.03.12 – 1695.09.23)
 Auxiliary Bishop: Alexander Dirre (1668.06.11 – 1669.11.21)
 Auxiliary Bishop: Archbishop Johann Joseph Reichsgraf von Breuner (1670.12.15 – 1695.07.04)
 Coadjutor Bishop: Franciscus Antonius von und zu Losenstein (1690.11.27 – 1692.06.17)
 Fr. Karl Joseph von Lothringen (1694.09.13 – 1698.09.29)
 Auxiliary Bishop: Ferdinand Schröffel (1696.12.03 – 1702.08.23)
 Cardinal Wolfgang Hannibal von Schrattenbach (1711.09.15 – 1738.07.22)
 Jakob Ernst Graf von Liechtenstein-Kastelkorn (1738.10.11 – 1745.03.04)
 Cardinal Ferdinand Julius von Troyer (1745.12.09 – 1758.02.05)
 Leopold Friedrich Reichsgraf von Egkh und Hungersbach (1758.04.27 – 1760.12.15)
 Maximilian Reichsgraf von Hamilton (1761.03.04 – 1776.10.31)
 Cardinal Antonín Theodor Count of Colloredo-Waldsee (1777.10.06 – 1777.12.05)

Metropolitan Archbishops of Olomouc
 Cardinal Antonín Theodor Count of Colloredo-Waldsee (1777.12.05 – 1811.09.12)
 Cardinal Maria-Thaddeus von Trauttmansdorf-Wiesnberg (1811.11.26 – 1819.01.20)
 Cardinal Rudolf Johannes Joseph Rainier von Habsburg-Lotharingen (1819.03.24 – 1831.07.24)
 Coadjutor Archbishop: Archbishop-elect Rudolf Johannes Joseph Rainier von Habsburg-Lotharingen (later Cardinal) (1805.06.24 – 1811.09.15)
 Ferdinand Maria von Chotek (1832.02.24 – 1836.09.05)
 Cardinal Maximilian Joseph Gottfried Sommerau Beeckh (1836.11.21 – 1853.03.31)
 Cardinal Friedrich Egon von Fürstenberg (1853.06.27 – 1892.08.20)
 Théodore Kohn (1893.01.16 – 1904.06.10)
 Cardinal Frantisek Salesky Bauer (1904.05.10 – 1915.11.25)
 Cardinal Lev Skrbenský z Hřiště (1916.05.05 – 1920.07.06)
 Antonín Cyril Stojan (1921.03.10 – 1923)
 Leopoldo Precan (1923.11.10 – 1947.03.02)
 Joseph Matocha (1948.03.23 – 1961.11.03)
Apostolic Administrator Josef Vrana (1973.02.19 – 1987.11.30)
Apostolic Administrator František Vanák (1989.07.26 – 1989.12.21)
 František Vanák (1989.12.21 – 1991.09.14)
 Jan Graubner (1992.09.28 – 2022.05.13)
 Auxiliary Bishop (2017.07.05 – ...): Antonín Basler, Titular Bishop of Vaga (2017.07.05 – ...)
 Auxiliary Bishop (2017.07.05 – ...): Josef Nuzík, Titular Bishop of Castra Galbæ (2017.07.05 – ...)

Auxiliary bishops
 Josef Nuzík (2017.07.05 – )
 Antonín Basler (2017.07.05 – )
 Josef Hrdlička (1990.03.17 – 2017.02.01)
 Archbishop Jan Graubner (1990.03.17 – 1992.09.28)
 Cardinal František Tomášek (1949.10.12 – 1977.12.30)
 Joseph Martin Nathan (1943.04.17 – 1947.01.30)
 Stanislav Zela (1940.10.11 – 1969.12.06)
 Giovanni Stavel (1927.04.29 – 1938.11.06)
 Josef Schinzel (1922.11.14 – 1944.07.28)
 Guglielmo Blazek (1906.12.06 – 1912.03.05)
 Carlo Wisnar (1904.11.14 – 1926.04.18)
 Jan Nepomuk Weinlich (1904.11.14 – 1905.12.24)
 Gustavo de Belrupt-Tyssac (1880.12.13 – 1895.06.09)
 Rodolpho von Thysebaert (1842.05.23 – 1868.05.12)
 Archbishop Alois Josef Schrenk (1838.02.12 – 1838.09.17)
 Bishop-elect Franz Anton Gindl (1831.09.30 – 1831.11.16)
 Ferdinand Maria von Chotek (later Archbishop) (1817.04.14 – 1831.09.30)
 Alois Jozef Krakowski von Kolowrat (later Archbishop) (1800.12.22 – 1815.03.15)
 Karl Godefried Ritter von Rosenthal (1779.03.01 – 1800.05.25)
 Joannes Wenceslaus von Freyenfels (1771.12.16 – 1776.10.17)
 Matthias Franz Reichsgraf von Chorinsky (1769.09.11 – 1777.12.15)
 Johann Karl Leopold Graf von Scherffenberg (1749.04.21 – 1771.04.17)
 Otto Honorius Reichsgraf von Egkh und Hungersbach (1729.08.03 – 1748.04.30)
 Franz Julian Graf von Braida (1703.06.04 – 1727)

See also
List of Catholic dioceses in the Czech Republic
List of Roman Catholic bishops and archbishops of Olomouc
František Merta, a priest of the archdiocese convicted of child sexual abuse case

References

External links

 
GCatholic.org, with Google map - data for all sections

Olmomouc from catholic-hierarchy.org

 

Olomouc
Roman Catholic dioceses established in the 11th century
Roman Catholic dioceses in the Czech Republic
Roman Catholic dioceses in the Holy Roman Empire